Didier Opertti Badán (born 23 April 1937) is a Uruguayan political figure and lawyer.

Political offices in Uruguay

Interior Minister

Opertti served as the interior minister of Uruguay from 1995 to 1998 in the government of Julio María Sanguinetti.

Foreign Minister
Opertti subsequently served as Minister of Foreign Relations under both Presidents Sanguinetti and subsequently Jorge Batlle from 1998 until 1 March 2005.

Other offices

He served as the president of the United Nations General Assembly from 1998 to 1999.

As of 2006, he serves as Secretary-General of ALADI.

See also

 Politics of Uruguay

External links
 Biography
Interview (United Nations Chronicle)

Opertti Badan, Didier
Opertti Badan, Didier
People from Montevideo
Opertti Badan, Didier
Interior ministers of Uruguay
Foreign ministers of Uruguay
Uruguayan people of Italian descent
Permanent Representatives of Uruguay to the United Nations
20th-century Uruguayan lawyers
Members of the International Law Commission